Matthew James Looram Jr.  (March 26, 1921 – March 16, 2004) was an American diplomat. A career Foreign Service Officer, he served as U.S. Ambassador Extraordinary and Plenipotentiary to Benin from 1969 until 1971 and U.S. Ambassador Extraordinary and Plenipotentiary to Somalia from 1972 to 1973.

Looram was born in New York City on March 26, 1921. He graduated from Harvard and served in the US Army, 13th Airborne Division. Married to Bettina Jemima Looram (née Rothschild) (1924–2012) in 1943 and the father of Bettina Burr, they lived in Georgetown (Washington, D.C.) He died at his home in Langau, Austria on March 16, 2004, at the age of 82.

References

1921 births
2004 deaths
People from Georgetown (Washington, D.C.)
Ambassadors of the United States to Benin
Ambassadors of the United States to Somalia
Harvard University alumni
United States Army personnel of World War II